Lisa Deborah Adams ( Bonchek; July 29, 1969 – March 6, 2015) was an American writer known as @AdamsLisa, and outspoken supporter of and advocate for breast cancer research, employing both social media, and her personal blog  Her use of these channels sparked controversy in the traditional media fields. 

Bonchek was born in Nashville, Tennessee. July 29, 1969. Her parents were Dr. Lawrence Bonchek and Dr. Rita Bonchek. She studied at Cornell University and later graduated from Franklin & Marshall College. She earned a master's degree in sociology from Rutgers. She lived in Darien, Connecticut, where she died in 2015 at age 45 after a three year battle with Stage IV breast cancer, eight years after her initial diagnosis.  She was survived by her parents, brother, husband, and three children. In January 2014, Emma Gilbey Keller, at the time a reporter for The Guardian, and her husband Bill Keller, en executive editor for the New York Times criticized Adams for the volume of her posts about her cancer battle rather than fighting quietly. Bill left the Times in February and Emma resigned from The Guardian in April 2014 following significant criticism. The Guardian removed the piece.

References

External links
 Lisa's website and blog
 Lisa's twitter
 

1969 births
2015 deaths
American activists
American women bloggers
American bloggers
Deaths from cancer in Connecticut
Deaths from breast cancer
Franklin & Marshall College alumni
Rutgers University alumni
21st-century American women